Elvyn Bowen (10 July 1907 – 24 August 1965) was a Welsh cricketer.  Bowen was a left-handed batsman who bowled slow left-arm orthodox.  He was born at Llannon, Carmarthenshire.

Bowen made his first-class debut for Glamorgan in 1928 against Lancashire.  He played a further first-class match for the county, against Essex and played his third and final match for the county against Northamptonshire. In his 3 first-class matches he scored 40 runs at a batting average of 10.00, with a high score of 22.

Bowen died at Gorseinon, Glamorgan on 24 August 1965.

References

External links
Elvyn Bowen at Cricinfo
Elvyn Bowen at CricketArchive

1907 births
1965 deaths
Cricketers from Carmarthenshire
Welsh cricketers
Glamorgan cricketers